

Films

References

1984 in LGBT history
1984